Riodipine (INN; brand names Foridon and Ryosidine) is a calcium channel blocker.

References

Calcium channel blockers
Dihydropyridines
Carboxylate esters
Phenol ethers
Organofluorides
Methyl esters